Kiwaia hippeis is a moth in the family Gelechiidae. This species was first described by Edward Meyrick in 1901. It is endemic to New Zealand and has been collected in Christchurch. Adults of this species are on the wing in December and are attracted to light.

Taxonomy 
This species was first described by Edward Meyrick in 1901 using two specimens collected by R. W. Fereday in Christchurch and named Gelechia hippeis. George Hudson discussed and illustrated this species in 1928 in his book The butterflies and moths of New Zealand under the name Phthorimaha hippeis. In January 1988 Klaus Sattler placed this species within the genus Kiwaia. This placement was followed by J. S. Dugdale later in 1988. The female lectotype specimen is held at the Canterbury Museum.

Distribution 
This species is endemic to New Zealand and has been collected in Christchurch.

Description 
Meyrick originally described the species as follows:

Behaviour
Adults of this species are on the wing in December and are attracted to light.

References

Kiwaia
Moths described in 1901
Endemic fauna of New Zealand
Moths of New Zealand
Taxa named by Edward Meyrick
Endemic moths of New Zealand